Also known as the Malleolar groove.

There are two malleolar sulci, medial and lateral.

The medial malleolar sulcus is the posto-inferior groove just lateral to the medial malleolus on the distal part of the tibia.  It is where the tendons of the tibialis posterior and flexor digitorum longus course on their way to their insertions on the foot.

The lateral malleolar sulcus is the posto-inferior groove on the distal part of the fibula.  The tendons of the peroneus longus and peroneus brevis course behind it on the way to their insertions on the foot.

References

Bones of the lower limb